Monte Costone is a mountain of Lombardy, Italy. It is located within the Bergamo Alps.

See also 
 Alpine Brigade Orobica
 Swiss Alps
 List of national parks of the Alps

External links

Mountains of the Alps
Mountains of Lombardy